Emlin Cosmetics is a privately held company based in Bensenville, Illinois, and has been in business for over fifty years, manufacturing customized soap and bath amenity products for hotel chains.

Emlin`s product line are divided into three categories: skin and body care, makeup, and fragrance. Their products have been carried in stores such as Saks Fifth Avenue and Neiman Marcus. For over twenty-five years, they were the exclusive provider of bath care products for the Hyatt hotels domestically as well as many properties internationally. Additionally, for over fifteen years, they provided an amenity line for the Princess Cruises and Medline Industries. Their client list of clubs include numerous American Airlines Admirals clubs, the Standard Club, and the East Bank Club of Chicago, as well as many country clubs. Most recently, Emlin has been selected by both United Airlines and J.P. Morgan Chase Bank to be the only cosmetic line featured in their respective employee discount programs.

References

Cosmetics
Companies based in DuPage County, Illinois
Cosmetics companies of the United States
History of cosmetics
Bensenville, Illinois